Gorceixia is a genus of flowering plants in the daisy family.

Species
There is only one known species, Gorceixia decurrens, native to Brazil (Bahia, Espirito Santo, Minas Gerais).

References

Vernonieae
Endemic flora of Brazil
Monotypic Asteraceae genera
Taxa named by John Gilbert Baker